Paul E. Burns (January 26, 1881 – May 17, 1967) was an American actor, who had a very lengthy career on film and television, although mostly in bit parts.

He played Ebenezer Hawkins in Son of Paleface (1952), Latitude Bucket in The Royal Mounted Rides Again (1945), and Jim the Caretaker in The Mummy's Tomb (1942).

Partial filmography

 Jesse James (1939)
 Rose of Washington Square (1939)
 Men of the Timberland (1941)
 Saboteur (1942) - Farmer's Wife (uncredited)
 The Mystery of Marie Roget (1942) - Gardener
 The Mummy's Tomb (1942)
 Young Ideas (1943)
 The Royal Mounted Rides Again (1945)
 The Devil's Mask (1946)
 The Pilgrim Lady (1947)
 Smoky River Serenade (1947)
 Unconquered (1947)
 Adventures in Silverado (1948)
 The Wreck of the Hesperus (1948)
 The Big Gusher (1951)
 Son of Paleface (1952)
 Adventures of Superman (1953)
 Love Me Tender (1956) - Jethro
 Spartacus (1960) - Fimbria (uncredited)

References

External links 

1881 births
1967 deaths
American male film actors
American male television actors
20th-century American male actors
Place of birth missing